Top Chef: Texas is the ninth season of the American reality television series Top Chef. The season was filmed in various cities in Texas, including San Antonio, Dallas, and Austin, before moving on to British Columbia for the finale. The season premiered on November 2, 2011. This season of Top Chef featured a much larger number of contestants than any previous season, with 29 chefs. Top Chef: Texas also introduced a new side competition to the series; in addition to the Quickfire and Elimination Challenges featured in televised episodes, the Last Chance Kitchen competition allowed eliminated contestants to compete head-to-head in a series of webisodes, with the winner eventually returning to the main competition. In the season finale, Paul Qui was declared the winner over runner-up Sarah Grueneberg. Chris Crary was voted Fan Favorite.

Contestants

The cast of the ninth season of Top Chef initially consisted of 29 contestants. After the qualifying challenges in the first two episodes, the pool of chefs was narrowed down to 16.

Eliminated in qualifying rounds

Top 16

Nyesha Arrington later competed in Top Chef Duels. Grayson Schmitz returned to compete in Top Chef: California.

Contestant progress

: The chef(s) did not receive immunity for winning the Quickfire Challenge.
: Due to the qualifying rounds, the show did not use its traditional elimination format until the third episode.
: Beverly won Last Chance Kitchen and returned to the competition.
: As a reward for winning the Quickfire Challenge, Sarah was allowed to sit out the Elimination Challenge.
 (WINNER) The chef won the season and was crowned "Top Chef".
 (RUNNER-UP) The chef was a runner-up for the season.
 (WIN) The chef won the Elimination Challenge.
 (HIGH) The chef was selected as one of the top entries in the Elimination Challenge, but did not win.
 (IN) The chef was not selected as one of the top or bottom entries in the Elimination Challenge and was safe.
 (LOW) The chef was selected as one of the bottom entries in the Elimination Challenge, but was not eliminated.
 (OUT) The chef lost the Elimination Challenge.

Episodes

Last Chance Kitchen

References

Notes

Footnotes

External links

 Official website

Top Chef
2011 American television seasons
2012 American television seasons
Television shows set in Texas
Television shows filmed in Texas
Television shows filmed in British Columbia